Erynia is a genus of fungi within the family of Entomophthoraceae and order Entomophthorales of the Zygomycota. This has been supported by molecular phylogenetic analysis (Gryganskyi et al. 2012).

The genus name of Erynia was originally named by the Polish scientist Leon Nowakowski in 1881. It was named after the Greek mythological creatures known as the Erinyes or as the Romans called them, the Furies, who were described as spirits that claimed vengeance against a crime. It could be classed as an insect pest feeding on a plant, being a specific crime for which the fungus would kill the insect, thus exacting vengeance.

Distribution
It has a cosmopolitan distribution (scattered worldwide). Including Switzerland.

Hosts
Species Erynia conica infects two types of mosquitos; Aedes aegypti and Culex restuans.

Species
As accepted by Species Fungorum;

Erynia aquatica 
Erynia chironomi 
Erynia cicadellis 
Erynia conica 
Erynia curvispora 
Erynia delpiniana 
Erynia fluvialis 
Erynia gigantea 
Erynia gracilis 
Erynia henrici 
Erynia jaczewskii 
Erynia nebriae 
Erynia ovispora 
Erynia pentatomis 
Erynia phalangicida 
Erynia phalloides 
Erynia plecopteri 
Erynia rhizospora 
Erynia sepulchralis 
Erynia thurgoviensis 
Erynia triangularis 
Erynia tumefacta 
Erynia variabilis 

Former species; (all family Entomophthoraceae)

 E. americana  = Furia americana
 E. anglica  = Zoophthora anglica
 E. anhuiensis  = Zoophthora anhuiensis
 E. aphidis  = Zoophthora aphidis
 E. athaliae  = Zoophthora athaliae
 E. blunckii  = Pandora blunckii
 E. borea  = Pandora borea
 E. brahminae  = Pandora brahminae
 E. bullata  = Pandora bullata
 E. bullata  = Pandora bullata
 E. calliphorae  = Entomophthora calliphorae
 E. canadensis  = Zoophthora canadensis
 E. caroliniana  = Eryniopsis caroliniana
 E. castrans  = Strongwellsea castrans
 E. coleopterorum  = Entomophthora coleopterorum
 E. crassitunicata  = Zoophthora crassitunicata
 E. creatonoti  = Furia creatonoti
 E. creatonoti  = Furia creatonoti
 E. crustosa  = Furia gastropachae
 E. dacnusae  = Pandora dacnusae
 E. delphacis  = Pandora delphacis
 E. dipterigena  = Pandora dipterigena
 E. echinospora  = Pandora echinospora
 E. elateridiphaga  = Zoophthora elateridiphaga
 E. ellisiana  = Furia ellisiana
 E. erinacea  = Zoophthora erinacea
 E. forficulae  = Zoophthora forficulae
 E. formicae  = Pandora formicae
 E. geometralis  = Zoophthora geometralis
 E. gloeospora  = Pandora gloeospora
 E. humberi  = Zoophthora humberi
 E. ithacensis  = Furia ithacensis
 E. kondoiensis  = Pandora kondoiensis
 E. lanceolata  = Zoophthora lanceolata
 E. magna  = Strongwellsea magna
 E. minutispora  = Pandora minutispora
 E. montana  = Furia montana
 E. myrmecophaga  = Pandora myrmecophaga
 E. neoaphidis  = Pandora neoaphidis
 E. neopyralidarum  = Furia neopyralidarum
 E. nouryi  = Pandora nouryi
 E. occidentalis  = Zoophthora occidentalis
 E. orientalis  = Zoophthora orientalis
 E. petchii  = Zoophthora petchii
 E. phytonomi  = Zoophthora phytonomi
 E. pieris  = Furia pieris
 E. radicans  = Zoophthora radicans
 E. suturalis  = Zoophthora suturalis
 E. virescens  = Furia virescens
 E. vomitoriae  = Furia vomitoriae
 E. zabri  = Furia zabri

References

Entomophthorales
Zygomycota genera